Catagoniaceae is a small family of moss from the order, Hypnales. It is only found in South America and Oceania.

Classification 
It only a 1 genus: 

Catagonium Müll. Hal. ex Broth.

References

Hypnales
Moss families
Monogeneric plant families